Sixteen Fathoms Deep is a 1934 American film directed by Armand Schaefer and starring Lon Chaney Jr and Sally O'Neil. It was an early leading role for Chaney, then billed under his birth name "Creighton Chaney".

Plot
A sponge diver, Joe Bethel, hopes to make enough money to buy his own boat and marry his fiancée, Rosie. He must deal with a villainous fellow diver, Savanis.

Cast
Sally O'Neil as Rosie
Lon Chaney Jr. as Joe Bethel (billed as "Creighton Chaney")
Russell Simpson as A. B. Crockett
Maurice Black as Nick
Jack Kennedy as Mike
George Regas as Savanis
Constantine Romanoff as Kargas
Richard Alexander as Martin
Raul S. Figarola as Chinchin
Lloyd Ingraham as Old Athos
Robert Kortman as Cimos
Si Jenks as Sculpin

Production
O'Neil made the film after missing out on the role in Sitting Pretty (1933) to Ginger Rogers.

Reception
The New York Times called Sixteen Fathoms Deep a "good swaggering specimen" of action melodrama, "exciting, plausible and a lot of fun."

See also
 Down to the Sea (1936)
 Beneath the 12-Mile Reef (1953)

References

External links

Sixteen Fathoms Deep at BFI

Complete 1934 film at YouTube
. Complete 1948 film at YouTube

1934 films
Films directed by Armand Schaefer
Seafaring films
Films featuring underwater diving
Films set in Florida
Sponge diving
Monogram Pictures films
American black-and-white films
American adventure films
1934 adventure films
1930s English-language films
1930s American films